The Tombs is a detention complex in Manhattan, New York.

The Tombs may also refer to:

 The Tombs (film), a 1991 Argentine drama directed by Javier Torre
 The Tombs (novel), by Clive Cussler and Thomas Perry, 2012
 The Tombs (restaurant and bar), in the Georgetown neighborhood of Washington, D.C.

See also
 The Tomb (disambiguation)
 Tomb (disambiguation)